Do the Clips is Do As Infinity's fifth video collection.

Track listing
 "Tangerine Dream"
 "Heart"
 "Oasis"
 "Yesterday & Today"
 "Welcome!"
 "Raven"
 "Rumble Fish"
 "We Are."
 "Desire"
 
 "Week!"
 
 
 
 
 "Under the Sun"
 "Under the Moon"
 
 
 
 
 
 "Field of Dreams"
 
 "For the Future"
 "TAO"
 "Robot"
 "Be Free"

External links
 Do the Clips at Avex Network

Do As Infinity video albums
2009 video albums
2009 compilation albums
Music video compilation albums